Mising Baptist Kebang (MBK) is a Baptist churches convention based in Assam, India. It has six associations and is spread across six districts of Assam. It is an associate member of the Council of Baptist Churches in Northeast India, and has over 116 churches affiliated under MBK with 4,300 members. The MBK is made primarily of Mishing people, an indigenous ethnic group of Assam. The MBK mission center is at Moinapara, Gogamukh in Dhemaji District of Assam state.

History 
Mising Baptist Kébang(Convention) was established in 2005 by leaders of various  Mising Baptist Churches in Assam as a network organization for all the Mising Baptist Churches. The Mission Secretary of [Council of Baptist Churches in Northeast India](CBCNEI), Rev. Dr. Dusanü Venyo and General Secretary of CBCNEI Rev. Dr. Ngul Khan Pou helped establish the MBK as an associate member church of the CBCNEI.

Zonal Associations 
There are 8 zonal associations under the MBK, namely,
Dhemaji Mising Baptist Kebang, Kulajan, 
Jonai Mising Baptist Kebang, 
Takam Mising Baptist Kebang, Kalbari, Jorhat, 
Majuli Mising Baptist Kebang, Lakhimi, 
Sonitpur Mising Baptist Kebang, 14 No. Gohpur, 
Sodiya Mising Baptist Kebang, 
Margherita Mising Baptist Fellowship, Jagun, and 
Dhakuakhana Mising Baptist Association, Milan Nagar.

See also 

Boro Baptist Convention
Boro Baptist Church Association
Rabha Baptist Convention
Garo Baptist Convention
Nagaland Baptist Church Council
Manipur Baptist Convention
 Council of Baptist Churches in Northeast India
 North East India Christian Council
 List of Christian denominations in North East India

Sources

External links
mising.org Official website of MBK
CBCNEI website
 misingonline.com
 macgov.in Mising Autonomous Council website
 www.misingagomkebang.org Mising Agom Kebang website

2005 establishments in India
Christianity in Assam
Baptist Christianity in India